Sultanabad Colony is a residential area in Gulbahar of Liaquatabad Town in Karachi, Sindh, Pakistan.

There are several ethnic groups in Sultanabad Colony including Muhajirs, Sindhis, Kashmiris, Seraikis, Pakhtuns, Balochis, Memons, Bohras,  Ismailis, etc.

The Sultanabad Colony is divided into two parts:

 Sultanabad Colony No. 1 (or "Laal Building")
 Sultanabad No. 2 (or simply "Sultanabad")

Sultanabad No. 2
It is surrounded by:
 Gulbahar Thana (North West)
 Lyari River (South)
 Qureshi Colony (East)
 Firdous Colony (North East)
 Pasban Mohalla / Sindhi Para (West)
 Agror Colony (South East)
 Al-Karim Colony / Sultanaba No. 1 (South East)

These are the parts of colony:
 8 Residential Buildings (Block "D" - Block "K")
 A Jamatkhana (Worship place of Ismaili Community)
 A Ismaili Religious Education Centre / A Community Based School
 A Maintenance Office
 A Dispensary
 An External Shop Line
 A Park With Fountain
 A K.E.S.C. House

Map of Sultanabad No. 2
Visit it for Satellite Map Of Sultanabad No. 2

Residential buildings in Sultanabad No. 2
 Block D: In the northern part if colony. having 4 buildings. Each building consists of 4 floors. and each floor contains 4 flats.
 Block E: In Eastern part of colony, having 5 buildings. Each building consists of 4 floors. Each floor contain 3 flats.
 Block F: In Western part of colony, having a single building consists of 2 floors and G.Floor. Each floor contain 10 Flats.
At the ground floor, Two flats in corner are occupied by Sultanabad Library & Reading Room (Reading Room Section).

 Block G: In Eastern part of colony, having 4 buildings. Each building consists of 4 floors with 4 flats in each.
�* Block H: In Southern part of colony, having 4 buildings. Each building consists of 4 floors with 4 flats in each.

 Block I: In Southern part of colony, having 8 buildings. Each building consists of 4 floors with 4 flats in each. It is the largest building in colony by area, and number of flats.
�* Block J: In central part of Colony, having 4 buildings. Each buildings consists of 4 floors with 4 flats in each.
�* Block 	K: In the Northern part of colony, having 5 buildings labelled A, B, C, E. Each building consists of 4 floors with 2 flats in each, But E contains 4 floors with 4 flats in each.� there is hold Awami National Party.

Neighbourhoods of Karachi